The Children Who Cheated the Nazis is a documentary about the Kindertransport, by the director Sue Read and producer Jim Goulding. This documentary film was broadcast by Channel 4 on 28 September 2000, and has since been broadcast in America, Israel, France, Australia, Spain and worldwide.

The film is narrated by Lord Richard Attenborough, Academy Award winning film actor and director,  who features in the film, talking about the two Kindertransport children his family gave a home to.
	
Also featured is Warren Mitchell, whose family also took in a Kindertransport child.

See also
Into the Arms of Strangers: Stories of the Kindertransport
 The Power of Good: Nicholas Winton

External links
 
Production companies homepage for the documentary
Page from the Australian Broadcasting Corporation web site
Database entry at the British Film Institute's website

2000 films
Channel 4 original programming
Documentary films about children in the Holocaust
Kindertransport
2000 television specials
Documentary films about child refugees
Channel 4 documentaries
2000s British films